Alexei Savinov (born 19 April 1979) is a Moldovan football manager and former player who last managed Petrocub Hîncești.

Playing career
Savinov spent his playing career in Moldova, Ukraine and Azerbaijan.

International career
He played 36 matches for the Moldova national team between 2003 and 2011.

Managerial career
After his retirement, he has worked as a coach in Moldova. In September 2021, he was appointed assistant coach of Sfîntul Gheorghe. In June 2022, he was appointed head coach of Petrocub Hîncești.

References

External links
FIFA.com

1979 births
Living people
Moldovan footballers
Moldova international footballers
Moldovan expatriate footballers
Expatriate footballers in Ukraine
Moldovan expatriate sportspeople in Ukraine
Association football defenders
Expatriate footballers in Azerbaijan
FC Rapid Ghidighici players
CSF Bălți players
FC Politehnica Chișinău players
FC Zimbru Chișinău players
FC Volyn Lutsk players
FC Hoverla Uzhhorod players
FC Metalurh Zaporizhzhia players
FC Baku players
FC Costuleni players
FC Veris Chișinău players
Moldovan Super Liga players
Ukrainian Premier League players
Azerbaijan Premier League players
Footballers from Chișinău
Moldovan football managers
CS Petrocub Hîncești managers
Moldovan Super Liga managers